Luís Fernando Lourenço "Luffe" da Silva (born June 6, 1979 in Brazil) is a retired football goalkeeper and current youth coach for SJK.

Career

Club
In November 2010, Luís Fernando returned to Seinäjoki, signing for SJK.

Coaching
In November 2014, Luís Fernando became a youth coach for SJK following his retirement.

Personal life
In March 2013, Luís Fernando received Finnish citizenship.

Career statistics

References

1979 births
Living people
Brazilian footballers
Brazilian expatriate footballers
Clube Atlético Bragantino players
Association football goalkeepers
Veikkausliiga players
Kakkonen players
Ykkönen players
Expatriate footballers in Finland
Sepsi-78 players
Seinäjoen Jalkapallokerho players
Brazilian expatriate sportspeople in Finland
SJK Akatemia players
Finnish people of Brazilian descent
Naturalized citizens of Finland
People from Novo Horizonte, São Paulo